Nothaphoebe is a genus of plant in family Lauraceae. It contains 21 species, which range from mainland Southeast Asia through Indonesia and the Philippines to New Guinea.

Accepted species
21 species are currently accepted:
 Nothaphoebe annamensis A.Chev. ex H.Liu – Vietnam
 Nothaphoebe condensa Ridl. – Cambodia, Peninsular Malaysia, Myanmar, Thailand, and Vietnam
 Nothaphoebe coriacea (Kosterm.) Kosterm. – Borneo, Peninsular Malaysia, and Sumatra
 Nothaphoebe crassifolia (Ridl.) Kosterm. – Mentawai Islands
 Nothaphoebe elata (Kosterm.) Kosterm. – New Guinea
 Nothaphoebe falcata Blume – Sumatra
 Nothaphoebe foetida (Kosterm.) Kosterm. – Borneo
 Nothaphoebe gigaphylla (Kosterm.) Kosterm. – Bacan Islands in the Maluku Islands
 Nothaphoebe havilandii Gamble – Borneo
 Nothaphoebe helophila (Kosterm.) Kosterm. – Sumatra
 Nothaphoebe heterophylla Merr. – Borneo
 Nothaphoebe kingiana Gamble – Peninsular Malaysia and Vietnam
 Nothaphoebe leytensis (Elmer) Merr. – Philippines
 Nothaphoebe macrocarpa (Blume) Meisn. – Java and the Lesser Sunda Islands
 Nothaphoebe magnifica (Kosterm.) Kosterm. – Sumatra
 Nothaphoebe novoguineensis Kaneh. & Hatus. – New Guinea
 Nothaphoebe pachyphylla Kosterm. – Borneo
 Nothaphoebe pahangensis Kosterm. – Peninsular Malaysia
 Nothaphoebe sarawacensis Gamble – Borneo
 Nothaphoebe siamensis Kosterm. – Thailand
 Nothaphoebe umbelliflora (Blume) Blume – Thailand, Laos, Cambodia, Vietnam, Malaysia, Indonesia, Philippines, and New Guinea

References

 
Lauraceae genera
Taxonomy articles created by Polbot
Flora of Southeast Asia
Flora of New Guinea